Mohamed Husseini Mohamed, also known by the allias "Tshabalala" (born 11 January 1996) is a Tanzanian football player. He plays for Simba  and the Tanzania National Team

International
He made his Tanzania national football team debut on 22 November 2015 in a 2015 CECAFA Cup game against Somalia.

He was selected for the 2019 Africa Cup of Nations squad.

References

External links
 
 

1996 births
Living people
Tanzanian footballers
Tanzania international footballers
Association football defenders
Simba S.C. players
2019 Africa Cup of Nations players
Tanzanian Premier League players